Whaleback Mountain is a  summit in British Columbia, Canada.

Description
Whaleback Mountain is located in Yoho National Park, in the Waputik Mountains of the Canadian Rockies. Precipitation runoff from Whaleback drains into tributaries of the Yoho River which in turn is a tributary of the Kicking Horse River. The peak is visible from Highway 1 (the Trans-Canada Highway). The nearest higher neighbor is Isolated Peak,  to the northwest.

History

The mountain was named in 1901 by mountaineer Edward Whymper because the mountain's profile resembles the back of a whale. The mountain's descriptive name was then applied in 1916 by members of the Alberta-British Columbia Boundary Survey. The mountain's toponym was officially adopted on March 31, 1924, by the Geographical Names Board of Canada.

Geology

Whaleback Mountain is composed of sedimentary rock laid down during the Precambrian to Jurassic periods. Formed in shallow seas, this sedimentary rock was pushed east and over the top of younger rock during the Laramide orogeny.

Climate

Based on the Köppen climate classification, Whaleback Mountain is located in a subarctic climate zone with cold, snowy winters, and mild summers. Winter temperatures can drop below −20 °C with wind chill factors below −30 °C.

Gallery

See also
Geography of British Columbia

References

External links
 Whaleback Mountain: Weather forecast
 Parks Canada web site: Yoho National Park

Two-thousanders of British Columbia
Canadian Rockies
Mountains of Yoho National Park
Kootenay Land District